William Shearer may refer to:

 William Shearer (British Free Corps), member of the Waffen-SS British Free Corps
 William Shearer (immunologist) (1937–2018), American immunologist
 Bill Shearer (William K. Shearer, 1931–2007), co-founded the American Independent Party